Taylor Lapilus (born 8 April 1992) is a French mixed martial artist and boxer who currently competes in Bantamweight division of the Ultimate Fighting Championship (UFC). He is the former TKO Major League MMA Bantamweight Championship.

Background
Born and raised in Villepinte, Lapilus competed in soccer on various levels as a youngster. Before he began training in martial arts, he briefly attended college where he studied, and worked for a time as a welder.

Mixed martial arts career

Early career
Lapilus followed the path of his brother Damien, who is also a professional mixed martial artist, and began training in mixed martial arts in 2010. He made his debut as a professional in 2012, competing as a featherweight for primarily for various regional promotions across France. He was able to compile a record along the way of 8–1. On the heels of his finish of Cyril Ericher in May 2014, Lapilus signed with the UFC in the fall of 2014.

Ultimate Fighting Championship
Lapilus was expected to make his promotional debut on 4 October 2014 as a short notice replacement against Dennis Siver at UFC Fight Night 53, filling in for an injured Robert Whiteford. However, the Swedish Mixed Martial Arts Federation subsequently deemed Lapilus an unsuitable opponent, and in turn, Charles Rosa was tabbed as the last-minute replacement.

Lapilus eventually made his debut against Rocky Lee on 11 April 2014 at UFC Fight Night 64.  Lapilus won the fight via unanimous decision.

Lapilus faced Yuta Sasaki on 20 June 2015 at UFC Fight Night 69.  Lapilus won the fight via TKO in the second round.

Lapilus faced Érik Pérez on 21 November 2015 at The Ultimate Fighter Latin America 2 Finale. He lost the fight by unanimous decision.

Lapilus next faced Leandro Issa on September 3, 2016 at UFC Fight Night 93. He won the fight by unanimous decision.

Post-UFC career
After the sole boxing bout in 2017, Lapilus racked Bantamweight Championships in both TKO Major League MMA and German MMA Championships. In November 2019, it was revealed that Lapilus has signed with a new, Afro-European MMA promotion ARES Fighting Championship. Lapilus was expected to make his promotional debut in the promotion's inaugural event on December 14, 2019 against Bryan Caraway. However, Caraway withdrew from the bout due to an injury and was replaced by Marcos Breno. He won the fight via unanimous decision.

Lapilus faced Wilson Reis at Ares FC 2 on December 12, 2021. He won the bout via unanimous decision.

Lapilus faced Demarte Pena for the vacant AFC Bantamweight Championship on April 16, 2022 at Ares FC 5. He won the bout and title via TKO stoppage in the first round.

Return to UFC
Lapilus was scheduled to face  Khalid Taha on September 3, 2022 at UFC Fight Night 209. However, Lapilus withdrew a week before the event due to a broken hand and was later replaced by Cristian Quiñónez.

Mixed martial arts style
Taylor Lapilus has 18 wins out of 21 fights with a 56% finish rate, including 8 by decision, 6 by submission and 4 by knockout. He has never been knocked out or submitted.

Having started his martial arts career with grappling and Brazilian jiu-jitsu, he is a very comfortable grappler. Lapilus is also a good striker, being a long time Muay Thai practitioner. Furthermore, he is interested in Israeli fighting system Krav Maga and participated in several induction trainings and programmes.

Professional boxing career
After a 3–1 run in the UFC Lapilus opted to try his hands at boxing, facing Heri Andriyanto on May 27, 2017. He won by unanimous decision.

Mixed martial arts record

|-
|Win
|align=center|18–3
|Demarte Pena
|TKO (elbows and punches)
|Ares FC 5
|
|align=center|1
|align=center|2:33
|Paris, France
|
|-
|Win
|align=center|17–3
|Wilson Reis
|Decision (unanimous)
|Ares FC 2
|
|align=center|3
|align=center|5:00
|Paris, France
|
|-
|Win
|align=center|16–3
|Marcos Breno
|Decision (unanimous)
|Ares FC 1 
|
|align=center|3
|align=center|5:00
|Dakar, Senegal
| 
|-
|Win
|align=center|15–3
|Nate Maness
|TKO (side kick)
|TKO 48: Sousa vs Gane 
|
|align=center|3
|align=center|1:22
|Gatineau, Quebec, Canada
|
|-
|Win
|align=center|14–3
|Josh Hill
|Decision (split)
|TKO 45: Jourdain Vs Morgan 
|
|align=center|3
|align=center|5:00
|Montreal, Canada
|
|-
|Loss
|align=center|13–3
|Denis Lavrentyev
|Decision (unanimous)
|RCC: Intro
|
|align=center|3
|align=center|5:00
|Ekaterinburg, Russia
|
|-
|Win
|align=center|13–2
|Farbod Nezhad
|TKO (punches)
|German MMA Championship 14
|
|align=center|1
|align=center|2:16
|Castrop-Rauxel, Germany
|
|-
|Win
|align=center|12–2
|Omer Solmaz
|Decision (split)
|German MMA Championship 13
|
|align=center|5
|align=center|5:00
|Düsseldorf, Germany
|
|-
|Win
|align=center|11–2
|Leandro Issa
|Decision (unanimous)
|UFC Fight Night: Arlovski vs. Barnett
|
|align=center|3
|align=center|5:00 
|Hamburg, Germany
|
|-
|Loss
|align=center|10–2
|Érik Pérez
|Decision (unanimous)
|The Ultimate Fighter Latin America 2 Finale: Magny vs. Gastelum
|
|align=center|3
|align=center|5:00
|Monterrey, Mexico
|
|-
|Win
|align=center|10–1
|Ulka Sasaki
|TKO (punches)
|UFC Fight Night: Jędrzejczyk vs. Penne
|
|align=center|2
|align=center|1:26
|Berlin, Germany
|
|-
|Win
|align=center|9–1
|Rocky Lee
|Decision (unanimous)
|UFC Fight Night: Gonzaga vs. Cro Cop 2 
|
|align=center|3
|align=center|5:00
|Kraków, Poland
|
|-
|Win
|align=center|8–1
|Cyril Ericher
|Submission (guillotine choke)
|100% Fight 22 
|
|align=center|1
|align=center|2:58
|Aubervilliers, France
|
|-
|Win
|align=center|7–1
|Osman Minbatirov
|Decision (split) 
|Honor and Glory Fight Night 3
|
|align=center|3
|align=center|5:00
|Béziers, France
|
|-
|Win
|align=center|6–1
|Cyrille Dimbas
|Submission (armbar)
|100% Fight 19 
|
|align=center|1
|align=center|3:41
|Aubervilliers, France
|
|-
|Loss
|align=center|5–1
|Magomed Bibulatov
|Decision (unanimous) 
|GEFC - Urban Legend Prestige 4
|
|align=center|3
|align=center|5:00
|Villepinte, France
|
|-
|Win
|align=center|5–0
|Nicolas Joannes
|Submission 
|Knock Out Championship 6
|
|align=center|1
|align=center|2:50
|Cognac, France
|
|-
|Win
|align=center|4–0
|Chresus Mokima
|Submission (armbar) 
|100% Fight 13  
|
|align=center|2
|align=center|1:32
|Aubervilliers, France
|
|-
|Win
|align=center|3–0
|Steve Polifonte
|Decision (unanimous)
|100% Fight - Contenders 16 
|
|align=center|2
|align=center|5:00
|Paris, France
|
|-
|Win
|align=center|2–0
|Souksavanh Khampasath
|Submission (triangle choke)
|100% Fight - Contenders 16 
|
|align=center|1
|align=center|0:43
|Paris, France
|
|-
|Win
|align=center|1–0
|Isa Abiev
|Submission (triangle choke)
|OFC 4
|
|align=center|1
|align=center|3:35
|Hainaut, Belgium
|
|-

Professional boxing record

See also
 List of current UFC fighters
 List of male mixed martial artists

References

External links

1992 births
French male mixed martial artists
Bantamweight mixed martial artists
Mixed martial artists utilizing boxing
Living people
Sportspeople from Paris
French practitioners of Brazilian jiu-jitsu
French mixed martial artists of Black African descent
Ultimate Fighting Championship male fighters
Mixed martial artists utilizing Brazilian jiu-jitsu